Matthias Nicoll (1630 – December 22, 1687), a.k.a. Nicolls, was the sixth mayor of New York City from 1672 to 1673.  He is the patriarch of the Nicoll family, which settled and owned much of Long Island, New York.  Numerous place names on the island now bear the Nicoll name.

Early life
Nicoll was born in 1627 and was son of a minister. He lived in Islip, Northamptonshire, and practiced law there.

Life in America
In 1664, he came to the North America with Richard Nicolls.  It is not known if the two were related, although some sources say he was Richard's nephew.  Matthias was Richard's secretary and was present to the first surrender of the Dutch New Amsterdam to the English.  He was clerk of the court in the new English colony and served various judge roles.  He was a member of the Convention at Hempstead, New York, in 1664–1665 that established the laws for the new colony.

In 1670, he bought land in present Plandome Manor, New York/Plandome, New York, and he is said to have named it for the Latin 'planus domus' meaning 'plain' or 'peaceful' home.

Political career
In 1672 he was appointed New York City mayor, and served for two years.  He was speaker of the General Assembly under Thomas Dongan in 1684 which guaranteed religious freedom to Christians.

Personal life
He and his wife were buried in front of the manor home, although the exact spot is not now known because it was vandalized.  A plaque on Plandome Road marks the general area.

The Suffolk estate Islip was named after their ancestral home in England.

The manor house itself was torn down in 1998 by its new owner.

References

1630 births
1687 deaths
Mayors of New York City
People of the Province of New York
People from Plandome Manor, New York
People from Plandome, New York
People from North Northamptonshire